The Wonderful End of the World is a 2008 video game made by Dejobaan Games. It involves a marionette that grabs as many objects as she can before the end of the world. It has been compared with Katamari Damacy due to their similar gameplay.

Gameplay 
In The Wonderful End of the World, the player takes control of a puppet that is able to grab small objects. The object of the game is to grab as many small objects as they can, growing bigger with each object consumed. The level ends once the player has consumed a predetermined number of objects. Once the level ends, the player receives a grade ranging from A+ to F. There is also an exploration mode, where there is no objective.

Legacy 
The Wonderful End of the World was updated shortly before the release of Portal 2 in 2011 as part of an alternate reality game. It was alongside several other games in the Potato Sack. A secret level containing Portal easter eggs and potatoes was added to the game. Once enough players found these potatoes, Portal 2 was released.

References

External links 
Official site 

2008 video games
3D GameStudio games
Action video games
Dejobaan Games games
Indie video games
Single-player video games
Video games developed in the United States
Windows games
Windows-only games